The 1997–98 Vysshaya Liga season was the sixth season of the Vysshaya Liga, the second level of ice hockey in Russia. 16 teams participated in the league. HC Lipetsk won the Western Conference, and Neftyanik Almetyevsk won the Eastern Conference

First round

Western Conference

Eastern Conference

Final round

Western Conference

Eastern Conference

External links 
 Season on hockeyarchives.info
 Season on hockeyarchives.ru

Russian Major League seasons
2
Rus